SS S.C. Baldwin was a wooden-hulled steam barge built in 1871, that capsized in a storm on August 26, 1908, on Lake Michigan, off Two Rivers, Wisconsin, United States, with the loss of one life. On August 22, 2016 the remnants of S.C. Baldwin were listed in the National Register of Historic Places as reference number 16000565.

History

S.C. Baldwin (Official number 23957) was built in 1871 by Campbell, Owen & Company of Detroit, Michigan for the Escanaba & Lake Michigan Transportation Company to carry iron ore from Escanaba, Michigan to the ports of Chicago, Illinois and Milwaukee, Wisconsin. She was named after an officer of the Chicago & Northwestern Railroad. She had a gross register tonnage of 418 tons. At the start of her career she had a single deck.

In March of 1873 S.C. Baldwin had a second deck added in Chicago, Illinois, this increased her gross register tonnage to 634 tons, and is believed to have made her the first double decked steamer on the lakes. On April 30, 1876 she went ashore at North Point Reef on Lake Huron. On June 18, 1876 S.C. Baldwin collided with the schooner Ellen Spry off Kewaunee, Wisconsin. On April 28, 1877, S.C. Baldwin went ashore near Alpena, Michigan, and was repaired afterwards in Detroit, Michigan. In 1879 S.C. Baldwin was sold to the Inter Ocean Transportation Company of Milwaukee, Wisconsin. In April 1882 she was sold to David Whitney Jr. of Detroit, Michigan, and her second deck was removed in order to refit her for the lumber trade. after the refit, S.C. Baldwin gross register tonnage was reevaluated to 412.5 tons. In 1884 it was reported that she was damaged near Ashland, Wisconsin. In September 1886 S.C. Baldwin went aground in Lake George in the St. Marys River with the freighter ; both of them were released by the tug Mystic. In 1891 she was sold to the Whitney Transportation Company of Hamtramck, Michigan. In 1892 S.C. Baldwin was sold to S.R. MacLaren of Toledo, Ohio.

The tugs Wright and Nelson went to try and raise S.C. Baldwin, but could only move her . This caused her cargo of lumber to roll off her deck, and break her upper cabin structure off. In April, 1904 S.C. Baldwin  was raised, and purchased by Adolph Green of the Green Stone Company. Despite some damage to her rudder and her keel, her hull remained mostly intact. In July, 1904 the Green Stone Company decided to convert S.C. Baldwin to a barge, and removed her machinery in the winter of 1904. In June 1905 S.C. Baldwin started hauling limestone from Sturgeon Bay, Wisconsin to Milwaukee, Wisconsin, and other ports up Lake Michigan's west coast.

Final voyage
On August 26, 1908 S.C. Baldwin, and scow No.37 were headed south from Sturgeon Bay, Wisconsin with a cargo of stone, in tow of the tug Torrent. The three vessels encountered a storm as they were passing Kewaunee, Wisconsin, and at around midnight, S.C. Baldwin began taking on water. At around 3:00 A.M., she capsized and remained unnoticed by the crew of Torrent until sunrise. When she capsized, two of her crew members jumped off, leaving a single crewman clinging to her hull. When Torrent crew realized she had capsized, they cut the line connecting the vessel. S.C. Baldwin turned over again, and sank. After the remaining crewman was rescued, Torrent went to search for the missing crew members. After her crew didn't find S.C. Baldwin crew, they sailed to Manitowoc, Wisconsin to tell the lifesaving station. after this, Torrent and some other vessels went back to retrieve scow No.37, and search for the missing men. On August 28, Captain George Heim, the Captain of S.C. Baldwin was located by the Goodrich Transportation Company vessel Caroline. A few days later, the body of Jacob Witgen, the other crewman washed ashore near Kewaunee, Wisconsin.

S.C. Baldwin today
The wreck of S.C. Baldwin was discovered sometime in the mid-1970s by sport fishermen who reported her location to divers. Her wreck is a popular recreational dive site, as she lies in only  of water. Her wreck sits upright, with her stempost intact. Other than her stempost, her wreck consists of her stern, her stern deck and her transom. In 2015 the Wisconsin Historical Society conducted a full archeological survey of her wreck.

References

Maritime incidents in 1908
National Register of Historic Places in Manitowoc County, Wisconsin
Shipwrecks of Lake Michigan
Steamships of the United States
Great Lakes ships
Merchant ships of the United States
1871 ships
Ships built in Detroit
Shipwrecks on the National Register of Historic Places in Wisconsin
Steam barges
Shipwrecks of the Wisconsin coast
Wreck diving sites in the United States
Ships sunk in storms